Eupachygaster tarsalis, the sarce black, is a European and Asian species of soldier fly.

Distribution
Austria, Azerbaijan, Belgium, Bulgaria, Czech Republic, Denmark, England, France, Germany, Hungary, Poland, Romania, Russia, Slovakia, Sweden, Switzerland, Turkmenistan, Yugoslavia.

References

Stratiomyidae
Diptera of Europe
Diptera of Asia
Insects described in 1842
Taxa named by Johan Wilhelm Zetterstedt